Alejo R. Mabanag (born July 14, 1886 – ?) was a Filipino politician born in San Fernando, La Union, to Liberato Mabanag of Calamanugan, Cagayan and Manuela Ragojo of Bangar, La Union.

Education
Mabanag supported himself while getting his higher education. He was clerk in the defunct Executive Bureau from 1903 to 1912 and finished his Bachelor of Arts at the University of Santo Tomas in 1908. He was senior clerk when he obtained his Bachelor of Laws degree from La Jurisprudencia in 1912 and passed the bar examinations the same year. He opened his law firm in Lingayen, Pangasinan and attracted big clients in the province.

Political career
His popularity and his ability became his qualifications for a three-year service as Lingayen municipal councilor from 1916 to 1919. He ran for Senator and won overwhelmingly to represent the Second Senatorial District in 1922 and re-elected in 1931.

Upon the establishment of the Commonwealth government on November 15, 1935, President Manuel L. Quezon appointed him Judge of the Court of First Instance of Iloilo up to 1938 and later named as city fiscal of Manila until 1945.

He ran anew for the Senatorial election and won in 1946 but he lost in the 1949 election. As a distinguished Senator he became the chairman of the Senate Blue Ribbon Committee from August 1952 to August 1953 and in the 1953 elections he ran and won again as Senator under Nacionalista Party ticket.

He was also member of the following committees; Corporations and Franchises, Codes and Constitutional amendments, Government Reorganization, Investigation, Justice, Labor and Immigration, National Defense and Security, National Enterprises, provincial and Municipal Governments and Cities, Transportation and Public Service.

Family
He is a father of 13. Some of them named: Ramon Mabanag, Alfredo Mabanag, Jose Mabanag and Antonio Mabanag. He never stole from the people and raised his family with dignity. He has this saying in Pilipino "Mabuti nang mahirap ka, basta hindi ka nandaraya." translated in English "Its better to be poor and not cheat". This saying was passed on from him, to his children, to his grandchildren and up to now – to his great grandchildren.

External links
Official Website of the Senate of the Philippines

20th-century Filipino lawyers
Senators of the 6th Philippine Legislature
Senators of the 7th Philippine Legislature
Senators of the 9th Philippine Legislature
Senators of the 10th Philippine Legislature
Senators of the 1st Congress of the Philippines
Senators of the 3rd Congress of the Philippines
Senators of the 4th Congress of the Philippines
People from San Fernando, La Union
1886 births
Nacionalista Party politicians
Year of death missing
University of Santo Tomas alumni
Secretaries of Justice of the Philippines
Garcia administration cabinet members